Jo-Wilfried Tsonga was the two-time defending champion but lost in the final to Gilles Simon, 4–6, 3–6.

Seeds
The top four seeds receive a bye into the second round.

Draw

Finals

Top half

Bottom half

Qualifying

Seeds
All seeds, along with two other players, received byes into the second round.

Qualifiers

Lucky losers
  Michael Berrer

Qualifying draw

First qualifier

Second qualifier

Third qualifier

Fourth qualifier

References
 Main Draw
 Qualifying Draw

Singles